is a former Japanese football player and wheelchair basketball player. He has competed in the 4 Summer Paralympics.

Football career
Kyoya was born in Muroran on August 13, 1971. After graduating from high school, Kyoya joined Japan Soccer League team Furukawa Electric (later JEF United Ichihara) in 1990. He played many matches from 1991. In 1992, Japan Soccer League was folded and founded new league J1 League. In October 1993, he debuted in J.League games against Gamba Osaka at J.League Cup.

However, on November 28, 1993, Kyoya injured his spinal cord in a traffic accident. He retired from football career, as he could not walk.

Wheelchair basketball career
In 1994, Kyoya started wheelchair basketball career. He has competed in the 4 Summer Paralympics; 2000, 2004, 2008 and 2012. After 2012 Paralympics, he retired wheelchair basketball players career.

Club statistics

Television movie
A television movie inspired by Kyoya's story titled  was broadcast on Fuji TV on January 3, 2017. Arashi's member Sho Sakurai portrayed Kyoya.

References

External links

1971 births
Living people
Association football people from Hokkaido
Japanese footballers
Japan Soccer League players
J1 League players
JEF United Chiba players
Japanese men's wheelchair basketball players
Paralympic athletes of Japan
Association football midfielders
People from Muroran, Hokkaido